Jagat Shiromani is a Hindu temple situated in Amer, India. This temple is dedicated to the Hindu gods Meera bai, Krishna and Vishnu. It was constructed between 1599 and 1608 AD by Queen Kanakwati, who was the wife of King Man Singh I The temple was built in the memory of their son Jagat Singh.

History 
The temple is considered to be an important part of local history within Amer Town. The temple contains a statue of Krishna which has significance to the Hindu faith. According to religious doctrines the statue is the same statue that Meera Bai worshipped in the State of Mewar.

Gallery

References 

Hindu temples in Rajasthan